Bernadette Thérèse Marie Chirac ( Chodron de Courcel; born 18 May 1933) is a French politician and the widow of the former president Jacques Chirac.

She and Chirac met as students at Sciences Po, and were married on 16 March 1956. They had three children: Laurence (born 4 March 1958, deceased 14 April 2016) and Claude Chirac (born 6 December 1962), and a Vietnamese foster-daughter, Anh Đào Traxel.

Since 2001, Bernadette has been the patron of Opération Pièces Jaunes, a charity that helps children in French hospitals by collecting small donations. On 3 September 2007, she became the president of the "Fondation Claude-Pompidou" (Claude Pompidou Foundation), following the death Claude Pompidou, a former First Lady of France.

She was involved in her husband's successful 1995 presidential campaign and her personal popularity saw her play an important role as First Lady in her husband's reelection in 2002. She was also a councillor in Corrèze, the couple's home département.

Biography

Early life and education 
Born in Paris on 18 May 1933, Bernadette Thérèse Marie Chodron de Courcel was the daughter of Jean-Louis Chodron de Courcel (1907–1985), sales director of Emaux de Briare Inc., and Marguerite de Brondeau d'Urtières (1910–2000). She was the oldest of three children: her sister Catherine was born in 1946 and her brother Jérôme in 1948.

Her family were devout Catholics and she received a strict upbringing from her mother. Her father was called up in 1939 and imprisoned in Germany until the end of the Second World War. In June 1940, she and her mother fled to Lot-et-Garonne, where she attended the Sainte-Marthe school in Agen. From 1941 to 1943, after the occupation of the zone libre, they fled again to Gien in the Loiret. There she attended Sainte-Marie-des-Fleurs-et-des-Fruits school until the return of her father in 1945. The family settled in the sixth arrondissement of Paris. She went to the Paris Institute of Political Studies in 1950 where she met and married her future husband. Like most women at the time, upon marrying, she did not take her degree.

Political career 

 1971: Elected to the municipal council of Sarran (Department of Corrèze).
 1977: Aide to the mayor of Sarran.
 1979: Elected to the Departmental council of Corrèze and subsequently re-elected in March 1985, March 1992, March 1998, March 2004, March 2011 and again September 2011.
 1990: Founder and president of the "Association le Pont Neuf" designed to promote exchanges between young French people and young people from Asia.
 1991: President of an International Dance Festival.
 1994: President of the "Fondation Hôpitaux de Paris-Hôpitaux de France", a charitable foundation aiming to improve the day-to-day lives of the children and the elderly who have been hospitalised. She was also patron of Opération Pièces Jaunes, an annual fundraising campaign to improve conditions in children's hospitals.

Bernadette Chirac appeared in public for the last time in summer 2018, and she was no longer seen publicly at her husband's funeral service in 2019.

Books 
In 2001, Bernadette participated in a series of transcribed interviews with the conservative journalist, Patrick de Carolis. The book was called Conversation and was a bestseller, selling 350,000 copies in its first year of publication.

Genealogy

Immediate family 
 Father: Jean Chodron de Courcel (1907–1985), sales director. Studied at Eton followed by Cambridge University.
 Mother: Marguerite–Marie de Brondeau d'Urtières (1910–2000)
 Paternal grandfather: Robert Chodron de Courcel, diplomat and landowner.
 Paternal great grandfather: George Chodron de Courcel (1840–1904), naval officer.

Nobility of Bernadette Chirac 

Bernadette Chirac was born into an old aristocratic family of public servants, from the Trois-Évêchés. Her family includes military officers, goldsmiths, lawyers, diplomats and industrialists. They would become owners through marriages of factories in Gien and Briare, in the Loiret, which were famed for their porcelain and enamel mosaics. Like many old French families, Bernadette Chirac has several European royal families among her ancestors. In 1852, a decree by Napoleon III authorized the addition of Courcel, one of the family's properties, to their name. In 1867, Napoleon III made Alphonse Chodron de Courcel a hereditary baron for services rendered to the State.

Honours 
  Knight of the Legion of Honour
  Grand Cross of the Royal Norwegian Order of Merit
  Knight of the Order of the Smile
  Grand Officer of the Order of the Star of Romania
   Medal of Pushkin
  Grand Cross of the Sovereign Military Order of Malta
  Grand Cross of the Order of Charles III
  Grand Cordon of the National Order of Merit of Tunisia

Bibliography 
 2001: Bernadette Chirac by Bertrand Meyer-Stabley (Perrin Edition) 
 2006: La Fille de Cœur by Anh Đào Traxel (Flammarion Editions)  (a biography of the Chirac family by their foster daughter).
 2001: Conversation by Bernadette Chirac, with Patrick de Carolis, (Plon Editions)

References 

1933 births
20th-century French politicians
20th-century French women
Directors of LVMH
French nobility
Jacques Chirac
Living people
Politicians from Paris
Politicians of the French Fifth Republic
Sciences Po alumni
Spouses of French presidents
Spouses of prime ministers of France
Union for a Popular Movement politicians